Walhain is a municipality of Wallonia located in the Belgian province of Walloon Brabant. It consists of the former municipalities of Nil-Saint-Vincent-Saint-Martin, Tourinnes-Saint-Lambert and Walhain-Saint-Paul.

Villages of the municipality 
Walhain-Saint-Paul, Walhain, Sart-lez-Walhain, Nil-Saint-Vincent, Nil-Saint-Martin, Nil-Pierreux, Lerinnes, Tourinnes-Saint-Lambert, Tourinnes les Ourdons et Perbais

Sports
Walhain has two successful national division sport teams:

Firstly, they have a semi-professional football club, RFC Wallonia Walhain CG playing in the Promotion D, which is the 4th tier of Belgian football league. They unfortunately couldn't avoid relegation in 2007 after more than 10 years in the third division.

They also have a good volleyball club, with both women's and men's teams playing in the second national division (the first division in Belgium being professional).

References

External links
 

 
Municipalities of Walloon Brabant